Wasantha Kumaravila (born on December 31, 1955, as වසන්ත කුමාරවිල [Sinhala]) is a Sri Lankan actor, and stunt director. Particularly active in cinema in villain roles, Kumaravila is also a film producer and stunt performer. He is most notable for the role "Wasantha" in soap opera Nilanjana directed by Suki Jeyaram.

Early life
He was born on 31 December 1978 in Kalutara. He has one elder brother. His brother acted in few stage dramas. Kumaravila is married to his longtime partner Aruni and the couple has two daughters, Mahima and Tharushi.

Career
At the age of 14, Kumaravila met stunt director Sarath Silva. With the guidance of his brother and Silva, Kumaravila was selected to play in a fight in the 1992 film Kiyala Wadak Na directed by Hemasiri Sellapperuma. It was a small stunt act lasted about 45 seconds. In 1997, a film production crew came to Sri Lanka for the filming of stunt movie Bloodsport III starred by Daniel Bernhardt. Kumaravila joined with the film crew and had a three months international camping. After the film, he moved to stage dramas, where he performed as a professional stunt artist. In international cinema, Kumaravila first starred as a martial artist in the Hollywood movie Jackpot Part 3 under the guidance of veteran film director Chandran Ratnam. He also joined with some Italian, German, Pakistan and Indian films, where he gained lot of experience.

In 2003, he co-produced the film Underworld with Arjuna Kamalanath. In 2004, with the help of fellow stuntmen, Kumaravila produced the film Underworld. The film was directed by Sudesh Wasantha Pieris and starred Arjuna Kamalanath along with former stunt directors Rex Kodippili, Cletus Mendis and Robin Fernando. However, screening of the film abandoned after 14 days due to 2004 Indian Ocean earthquake and tsunami disaster. In 2016, along with Sanjeewa Kumara, Kumaravila produced the film Ran Sayura. In 2019, he produced his second cinema production, Maanaya. On 8 July 2016, he established a stunt school at Bellanvila.

In television, he made few notable roles in the serials: Ranthili Wewa, Sakuge Lokaya and Bandhana.

Filmography & Stunt Coordination

References

External links
 'Dharma Puthra' on the screen
 හැබැයි තෘප්තිමත්
 කලාකරුවන් ඔහොම අසරණ කරන්න එපා

Sri Lankan male film actors
Sinhalese male actors
Living people
1978 births
Stunt performers